Seminary Garden is located in Prague, Czech Republic.

External links

 
 Seminary Garden (Seminářská zahrada) at Prague.eu

Parks in Prague
Petřín